William Bratt (born 13 April 1988 in Oxford) is a British racing driver. He previously competed in the British Touring Car Championship with Rob Austin Racing.

Career

T Cars
After three years in Super 1 karting, Bratt moved into the T Cars series for drivers between fourteen and seventeen years old, in 2003. He finished fourth in the championship in his rookie season, winning a single race at Snetterton. He dominated the 2004 season, finishing every one of the eighteen races on the podium, winning fourteen of them to win the championship by 58 points from runner-up Ruth Senior.

Formula Renault
After his T Car championship, Bratt moved into single-seaters for the 2004 Formula Renault UK Winter Series, with Scorpio Motorsport. He finished eleventh in the championship, missing out on the top ten by just one point. This performance led to a full season campaign in 2005, staying with Scorpio. After a steady opening, Bratt recorded a best finish of eleventh twice before finishing fifteenth in the championship, and runner-up in the Graduate Cup for first-year drivers. He continued with Scorpio into the 2005 Winter Series, finishing ninth with 54 points.

Another campaign with Scorpio followed in 2006, and Bratt's results steadily improved resulting in a first win at Oulton Park. He also finished on the podium at Donington Park en route to eighth place in the championship. With six of the seven drivers who finished above him in 2006 moving out of the championship, Bratt became a championship contender for the 2007 season. Good starts from championship rivals Duncan Tappy and Dean Smith left Bratt on the back foot after the first few rounds. After achieving a double win at Croft, he added further wins at Oulton Park and Brands Hatch, but he was out of the championship running before the final few races such were the dominance of the Fortec cars of his rivals. Bratt was unopposed in third, finishing some 32 points clear of Adam Christodoulou. His performances earned him a place on the British Racing Drivers' Club's "Rising Star" scheme.

In the off-season, Bratt competed in the Formula Palmer Audi Autumn Trophy, finishing second in the series without winning a race. He also made a return to Formula Renault in the 2008 season, replacing Sho Hanawa at the Silverstone meeting in support of the World Series by Renault.

Formula Three
Bratt moved to Spain to compete in the Spanish Formula Three Championship for the 2008 season, competing for former Formula One driver Emilio de Villota's team. After two top-five finishes on his debut at Jarama, Bratt recorded both his first pole position and podium during the first race at Spa. After a barren run of just seven points in ten races, Bratt ended the season impressively with a pair of second places and a pair of third places at the final two rounds in Barcelona and Jerez, ultimately finishing fifth in the overall championship.

Euroseries 3000
Bratt continued with de Villota's team, moving into the Euroseries 3000 for the 2009 season. Heading into the final round, Bratt was one of four drivers who could still win the title as he was only six points behind championship leader Fabio Onidi. Bratt finished first and second in the two races, with his second-place finish breaking a tie with Marco Bonanomi. Both drivers finished with 71 points and four wins, but Bratt's second gave him a 3–2 advantage in relation to the championship. Not only winning the Euroseries 3000 title, Bratt also won the Italian Formula 3000 Championship crown.

GP2 Series
As a prize for winning the Euroseries 3000 title, Bratt won a drive in the GP2 Asia Series for the 2009–10 season with Euroseries 3000 organisers Coloni Motorsport.

Formula Two
Bratt moved into the FIA Formula Two Championship in 2010.

He was the only driver disqualified from a race that season. Bratt was disqualified from the second race at Silverstone having failed to obey a drive-through penalty and being black flagged – he finished second but received no points.

Bratt came 9th in the championship out of 30 drivers with 92 points despite missing 8 out of the 16 rounds.

British Touring Car Championship

Rob Austin Racing (2012–2013)

Bratt made his touring car debut with Rob Austin Racing at the Oulton Park round of the 2012 season. He finished eighth on his début in the Audi A4 and won Dunlop's "Most Improved Independent Driver Award". He stayed with the team for the next round at Croft but was unable to secure the sponsorship to continue in the championship at Snetterton. He returned to the team for the final three events of the season starting at Rockingham. He qualified a season best thirteenth on the grid at the final round at Brands Hatch and finished ninth in the first race before retiring from the second race having collided with the stricken BMW of Rob Collard. Bratt concluded the season 20th in the drivers standings after contesting half of the events.

Bratt will continue in the championship for the 2013 season with Rob Austin Racing, now competing under the WIX Racing banner.

Racing record

Career summary

† As Bratt was a guest driver, he was ineligible to score points.
 Season still in progress.

Complete GP2 Asia Series results
(key) (Races in bold indicate pole position) (Races in italics indicate fastest lap)

Complete FIA Formula Two Championship results
(key) (Races in bold indicate pole position) (Races in italics indicate fastest lap)

Complete British Touring Car Championship results
(key) (Races in bold indicate pole position – 1 point awarded in first race) (Races in italics indicate fastest lap – 1 point awarded all races) (* signifies that driver lead race for at least one lap – 1 point given)

Complete Formula Renault 3.5 Series results
(key) (Races in bold indicate pole position; races in italics indicate fastest lap)

Personal
Bratt attended Bloxham School, Oxfordshire and has a degree in history from Lincoln College, Oxford.

Will Bratt is also a musician (guitarist and writer) and plays in the popular Oxfordshire-based cover band Mr Blue and Little Liars.

References

External links
 Official website
 Career statistics from Driver Database
 Creative Agency of Will Bratt

1988 births
Living people
Sportspeople from Banbury
Alumni of Lincoln College, Oxford
English racing drivers
British Formula Renault 2.0 drivers
Formula Palmer Audi drivers
Euroformula Open Championship drivers
Auto GP drivers
GP2 Asia Series drivers
FIA Formula Two Championship drivers
People educated at Bloxham School
British Touring Car Championship drivers
Blancpain Endurance Series drivers
24 Hours of Spa drivers
Porsche Carrera Cup GB drivers
Pons Racing drivers
Scuderia Coloni drivers
De Villota Motorsport drivers
United Autosports drivers